Liew Chin Tong (born 27 November 1977) is a Malaysian politician who has served as the Deputy Minister of International Trade and Industry in the Pakatan Harapan (PH) administration under Prime Minister Anwar Ibrahim and Minister Tengku Zafrul Aziz since December 2022, Member of Parliament (MP) for Iskandar Puteri since November 2022 and Member of the Johor State Legislative Assembly (MLA) for Perling since March 2022. He served as State Leader of the Opposition of Johor from April 2022 to his appointment as a deputy minister in December 2022, the Deputy Minister of Defence in the PH administration under former Prime Minister Mahathir Mohamad and former Minister Mohamad Sabu from July 2018 to the collapse of the PH administration in February 2020, Senator from July 2018 to July 2021 and the MP for Kluang from May 2013 to May 2018 and Bukit Bendera from March 2008 to May 2013. He is a member of the Democratic Action Party (DAP), a component party of the PH coalition. He has served as Deputy Secretary-General of DAP since March 2022 and State Chairman of DAP of Johor. He was the Political Education Director of DAP.

Background
Liew was born on 27 November 1977 at Subang Jaya, Selangor. He had his early education at Kwang Hua Private High School up to 1995 before he pursued his tertiary education at Australian National University (ANU) and graduated with Bachelor of Asian Studies (Honours) and Bachelor of Arts in Political Science in 2004. He later obtained International Masters in Regional Integration at Asia-Europe Institute, University of Malaya (UM) in 2006.

Liew previously was the Executive Director of Penang Institute (previously Socio-Economic and Environmental Research Institute, SERI), 2009-2012 and Executive Director of Research for Social Advancement (REFSA), 2007–2011. He was also Former Visiting Research Fellow, Institute of Southeast Asian Studies (ISEAS), Singapore.

In 1999, Liew joined Democratic Action Party (DAP).

Political career
Liew was first elected to the Malaysian Parliament in the 2008 general election winning the constituency of Bukit Bendera, Penang. A political strategist prior to his election, Liew has been credited for masterminding Pakatan Rakyat's takeover of the Penang State Legislative Assembly. In the 2013 general election, Liew wrestled the Kluang parliamentary seat in Johor from the predecessor, Malaysian Chinese Association (MCA)'s Hou Kok Chung. In May 2018, he contested for the Ayer Hitam federal seat against the incumbent, Wee Ka Siong, who is also then-Deputy President of the Malaysian Chinese Association (MCA), a component party of the Barisan Nasional (BN) coalition. Liew was narrowly defeated by 303 votes in the 2018 general election which then-Opposition coalition PH coalition claimed victory and ousted the then-ruling BN coalition from the administration for the first time.

Deputy Defence Minister 
Liew was appointed as Deputy Defence Minister on 17 July 2018 until 24 February 2020, being the first Malaysian not of Malay descent to hold this office. During his tenure, together with then-Defence Minister Mohamad Sabu, the Ministry of Defence unveiled the inaugural Defence White Paper (DWP), a blueprint on building a national policy on defence and security. The DWP is an open document containing the direction and priorities of defence for a period of 10 years, from 2021 to 2030, spanning the 12th and 13th Malaysia Plans.

Deputy Secretary-General of DAP 
On 20 March 2022, on the 17th DAP National Congress, Liew was re-elected into the Central Executive Committee with 1008 votes, the 22nd highest vote. He was then appointed as Deputy Secretary-General in the 17th DAP CEC under current Secretary-General, Anthony Loke.

Bibliography

Books
 Liew Chin Tong (2021), Lim Kit Siang: Patriot. Leader. Fighter
 Liew Chin Tong (2020), The Great Reset: 100 Days of Malaysia's Triple Crisis
 Liew Chin Tong (2013), Putrajaya Milik Siapa?: Genta Media
 Liew Chin Tong (2013), Middle Malaysia: Centre Ground Is Battle Ground: Genta Media
 Liew Chin Tong (2009), Speaking for the reformasi generation Kuala Lumpur: Research for Social Advancement (REFSA)

Journals
 Liew Chin Tong and Francis Hutchison (2010), “Implementing Pro-Employment Policies at the Sub-national Level” in Ooi Kee Beng and Goh Ban Lee (eds) Pilot Studies for a New Penang, Penang: Socio-Economic and Environmental Research Institute (SERI), pp. 111–128.
 Liew Chin Tong (2007), “PAS’ Leadership: New Faces and Old Constraints" in Lorraine C. Salazar and Daljit Singh (eds) Southeast Asian Affairs 2007, Singapore: Institute of Southeast Asian Studies, pp. 201–213
 Liew Chin Tong (2007), “PAS politics: defining an Islamic State” in Edmund Terence Gomez Politics in Malaysia: the Malay dimension Oxon: Routledge, pp. 107–137. 
 William F. Case and Liew Chin Tong (2006) How Committed Is PAS to Democracy and How Do We Know It? Contemporary Southeast Asia, Volume 28, Number 3, December 2006, pp. 385–406

Chinese Books
《追寻理想国家：马来西亚政治史上的林吉祥》(2021) 吉隆坡：义腾研究中心 
《大复兴：马来西亚三重危机下的百日反思》(2020)吉隆坡：义腾研究中心 
《决战在中间：共创马来西亚2.0》(2013) 吉隆坡：众意出版
《小市民的政治经济学》（2011）吉隆坡：众意出版
《华教运动，动或不动》（2011）吉隆坡：新纪元学院校友会
《亮剑—踢爆马来政治》（2007）吉隆坡：义腾研究中心

Election results

References

Living people
1977 births
People from Selangor
Malaysian people of Hakka descent
Malaysian politicians of Chinese descent
Democratic Action Party (Malaysia) politicians
Members of the Dewan Rakyat
Members of the Dewan Negara
Members of the Johor State Legislative Assembly
21st-century Malaysian politicians